Ubuntu is a popular Linux distribution.

Ubuntu may also refer to:

 Ubuntu philosophy, an ethical concept of southern African origin
 Ubuntu theology, a theological concept of reconciliation in South Africa

Computing
 Ubuntu (typeface), a font family 
 Ubuntu Titling, a font
 Ubuntu Edge, a prototype smartphone

Media and music
 Ubuntu (film)
 Ubuntu (album), a 2018 album by Piso 21

Other uses
 Ubuntu Cola, a carbonated soft drink
 Ubuntu Local Municipality, Northern Cape, South Africa
 Ubuntu Party, South African political party
 Ubuntu Goode, a character in The Goode Family
 Ubuntu Cape Town F.C., a soccer club in Cape Town, South Africa

See also
 
 
 Ubundu, city in Tshopo Province, Democratic Republic of the Congo